Tímea Sugár (born 21 October 1977 in Pécs) is a former Hungarian international handball player and afterwards goalkeeping coach of Fehérvár KC. She played many years for Ferencváros and Fehérvár KC during her career, which must be ended because of her serious knee injury. She won EHF cup in 2005. After her retirement in 2007, she is working as goalkeeper coach in Hungary.

Achievements 
 Nemzeti Bajnokság I:
 Winner: 2000, 2002
 Silver Medalist: 2001, 2003
 Bronze Medalist: 2004
 Magyar Kupa:
 Winner: 2001, 2003
 EHF Champions League:
 Finalist: 2002
 EHF Cup:
 Winner: 2005
 Olympic Games:
 Silver Medalist: 2000
 World Championship:
 Silver Medalist: 2003
 Bronze Medalsit: 2005
 European Championship:
 Winner: 2000

References

External links 
 EHF page
 

1977 births
Living people
Hungarian female handball players
People from Pécs
20th-century Hungarian women